The Electoral (Amendment) (Dáil Constituencies) Act 2013 (No. 7) is a law of Ireland which revised Dáil constituencies in light of the 2011 census and a requirement to reduce the number of Dáil seats. The new constituencies took effect on the dissolution of the 31st Dáil on 3 February 2016 and a general election for the 32nd Dáil on the revised constituencies took place on 26 February 2016.

The membership of the Dáil had stood at 166 TDs since the 1981 general election. An amendment to electoral law in 2011 set the range of membership at between 153 and 160 TDs. In July 2011, the Minister for the Environment, Community and Local Government established an independent Constituency Commission under the terms of the Electoral Act 1997. The commission was chaired by John Cooke, judge of the High Court, and delivered its report in June 2012.

The Act implemented the recommendations of this report, replacing the Dáil constituencies defined in the Electoral (Amendment) Act 2009, which had been in effect since the 2011 general election. The size of the Dáil was reduced to 158 TDs, a reduction of 8, arranged in 40 constituencies.

This act was repealed by the Electoral (Amendment) (Dáil Constituencies) Act 2017, which took effect on the dissolution of the 32nd Dáil and used at the 2020 general election, held on 8 February.

Overview of changes

Change in seats
This table, summarises the changes in representation. It does not address revisions to the boundaries of constituencies.

Constituencies abolished

New constituencies

Constituencies for the 32nd Dáil

References

2013 in Irish law
Acts of the Oireachtas of the 2010s
Electoral Acts (Ireland)
2016 Irish general election